They Don't Know is the debut album by UK garage outfit So Solid Crew, released on 19 November 2001. The album features the singles "Oh No (Sentimental Things)", "They Don't Know", "Haters", "Ride wid Us" and the UK singles chart-topper "21 Seconds".

Track listing

Charts

Weekly charts

Year-end charts

Certifications

References

2001 debut albums
So Solid Crew albums
Independiente Records albums